The Bendigo Post Office is a building on Pall Mall in Bendigo, a provincial city in the Australian state of Victoria. The post office backs onto and is partly surrounded by Rosalind Park. The building was built between 1883 and 1887 by the contractors McCulloch and McAlpine and designed by Public Works architect George W. Watson in the Second Empire architectural style. The building shares a great deal with its neighbouring building, the Bendigo Law Courts, and had the same builder and designer and was built at around the same time.

Notable features of the building include its  clock tower (housing a five-bell carillon) and the elaborate facades on all four sides of building. The building was extensively restored between 1978 and 1987.

The building was used as a post office until 1997. It is currently used as Bendigo Tourism's visitor information centre and won Victorian Tourism Awards in 2009 and 2010. It was further inducted into Victorian Tourism's hall of fame in 2011. It was also awarded a tourism award by Qantas in 2010, in the category of Visitor Information and Services.

Bendigo Tourism describes the information centre as "Australia's Grandest Visitor Centre". The centre boasts a large information area, an adjoining gallery space as well as an area devoted to historical displays and museum items.

The building has been included on the Victorian Heritage Register as being of "architectural, historic, and aesthetic significance to Victoria".

References

External links

A Golden Heritage - The Bendigo Post Office
Bendigo Tourism Centre Website

Buildings and structures in Bendigo
Post office buildings in Victoria (Australia)
Second Empire architecture in Australia
Victorian Heritage Register Loddon Mallee (region)
1887 establishments in Australia
Government buildings completed in 1887